Viktor Alonen (born 21 March 1969) is an Estonian professional footballer, who currently plays for Türi Ganvix JK. He spent the prime years of his career playing for Flora Tallinn.

International career
He won a total of 71 international caps for the Estonia national football team during the 90s.
Alonen earned his first official cap as a substitute on 1992-06-03, when Estonia played Slovenia in a friendly match. He played his last game for the national team in the 2002 World Cup qualifier against Portugal in 2001.

External links
 Profile

References

1969 births
Living people
Estonian footballers
Estonia international footballers
FC Flora players
Viljandi JK Tulevik players
FC Kuressaare players
Sportspeople from Viljandi

Association football midfielders
JK Tervis Pärnu players